Mirko Guadalupi (born 9 February 1987) is an Italian footballer. He plays as a midfielder for F.C. Internazionale Milano.

Club career
On 5 July 2018, he joined Serie D club Team Altamura.

References

External links 
 
 

1987 births
People from Brindisi
Italian footballers
Association football midfielders
Living people
A.C. Perugia Calcio players
A.C.N. Siena 1904 players
A.C. Ancona players
F.C. Esperia Viareggio players
F.C. Pavia players
S.S.D. Città di Brindisi players
Cosenza Calcio players
A.C.R. Messina players
A.S. Martina Franca 1947 players
Potenza Calcio players
Serie A players
Serie B players
Serie C players
Serie D players
Footballers from Apulia
Sportspeople from the Province of Brindisi